Rumbelow is a surname. Notable people with the surname include:

 Donald Rumbelow (born 1940), British historian
 Nick Rumbelow (born 1991), American baseball pitcher
 Steven Rumbelow (1949−2016), British film director